Aytes is a surname. Notable people with the surname include:

Michael Aytes, Director of Homeland Security Programs at US Investigation Services 
Rochelle Aytes (born 1976), American actress and model

See also
Ayles
Ayten (disambiguation)